Fred Pescatore is a Manhattan-based author and internist who specializes in nutrition. He is best known as the author of the bestselling children's health book Feed Your Kids Well (1998) and The Hamptons Diet (2004).

Pescatore served as medical director of Dr. Robert Atkins’ Atkins Medical Center from 1994 to 1999. He opened his own medical practice, Partners in Integrative Medicine, in October 2003. Pecastore also serves as president of the International and American Associations of Clinical Nutrition.

Hamptons Diet

Pescatore has developed and marketed a low-carbohydrate, low-calorie diet known as the Hamptons diet. The diet is described as a mixture of the Atkins diet and the Mediterranean diet.

Pescatore departed from the high level of saturated fat recommended in the Atkins diet. Instead, the Hamptons diet focuses on eating monounsaturated fats. The diet advocates the use of macadamia nut oil and lean meats such as chicken and fish. Foods high in saturated fat are allowed in moderation. 

In 2008, The Gale Encyclopedia of Diets noted potential risks of the diet, "The Hamptons diet has been criticized by nutritionists for its inadequate allowances of fiber, vitamin C, calcium, folate, vitamin D, and vitamin E. The diet is also high in fat, which provides as much as 70% of the calories in some menu plans." Another criticism of the Hamptons diet is that the foods chosen for recipes are often expensive or hard to find. The recipes are also time-consuming and many require advance preparation. There is no scientific evidence that the Hamptons diet is effective as there have been no reports of clinical trials in mainstream research journals. It became a fad reported in celebrity and fashion magazines.

Clinical dietician Shweta Rastogi has listed the Hamptons diet as an example of a fad diet. Dietician Sue Baic has commented that "there is an unnecessary emphasis on cutting out carbohydrates and using very expensive foods which limits the application to most people".

Selected publications

Feed your kids well : how to help your child lose weight and get healthy
Thin for good : the one low-carb diet that will finally work for you
The allergy and asthma cure : a complete 8-step nutritional program
The Hamptons diet : lose weight quickly and safely with the doctor's delicious meal plans
Boost your health with bacteria
AHCC : Japan's medical breakthrough in natural immunotherapy

References

External links
 Dr. Pescatore’s Official Page

21st-century American non-fiction writers
American food writers
American health and wellness writers
American internists
Living people
Low-carbohydrate cookbook writers
Low-carbohydrate diet advocates
Pseudoscientific diet advocates
Year of birth missing (living people)